Anders Hylander (6 November 1883 – 10 February 1967) was a Swedish gymnast. He was part of the Swedish team that won the gold medal in the Swedish system event at the 1912 Summer Olympics.

References

1883 births
1967 deaths
Swedish male artistic gymnasts
Gymnasts at the 1912 Summer Olympics
Olympic gymnasts of Sweden
Olympic gold medalists for Sweden
Olympic medalists in gymnastics
Medalists at the 1912 Summer Olympics